Bernardo Guadagni (1361 – 1434) was twice elected Gonfalonier of Justice (President of the Republic of Florence). During his second term, he had his powerful rival Cosimo de' Medici arrested, imprisoned and sent to exile for five years. The Guadagni and the Medici families were wealthy banking families in Renaissance Florence Italy.

Guadagni was played by Brian Cox in the scripted television drama, Medici: Masters of Florence.

References

1367 births
1434 deaths
Rulers of Florence